Songtrust is a global digital rights management platform which allows songwriters and artists to manage their music publishing and related rights.  Based in New York, it is a division of Downtown.

Overview
Songtrust was founded by Downtown CEO Justin Kalifowitz and CSO Joe Conyers III. Launched in 2011, it enables creators at all levels to recover their royalties directly from more than 90 countries and 20,000 unique income sources worldwide.  The company also provides royalty collection services for global distributors such as CD Baby and The Orchard.

In January 2018, Molly Neuman, former drummer for riot grrrl band Bratmobile, joined Songtrust from her previous role as the first head of music for crowdfunding website Kickstarter. In October 2019 Molly Neuman was named President of Songtrust.

References

External links
 Songtrust Website

Music publishing companies of the United States
Publishing companies established in 2006